Nematoplexus rhyniensis is a fossil known from the Rhynie chert assigned to the nematophytes. It comprises a loose mass of coily aseptate tubes. Tubes which may have originated from a Nematoplexus-like plant are known from earlier Silurian sediments.

References 

Prehistoric plant genera
Silurian plants